The 1943–44 Copa México is the 28th staging of the Copa México, the 1st staging in the professional era.

The competition started on May 7, 1944, and concluded on July 16, 1944, with the Final, held at the Parque Asturias in México DF, in which Club España lifted the trophy for fourth time ever with a 6–2 victory over Atlante F.C.

This edition was played by 12 teams, first with a group stage and later a knock-out stage.

Group stage
Group East

Group Center

Group West

Final phase

Semifinals

Final

References
Mexico - Statistics of Copa México in season 1943/1944. (RSSSF)

Copa Mexico, 1943-44
Copa MX
Copa